Arctostaphylos pilosula is a species of manzanita, known by the common names La Panza manzanita and Santa Margarita manzanita, that is endemic to California.

Its common names comes from populations on the La Panza Range, near the town of Santa Margarita.

Distribution
The plant is endemic San Luis Obispo County, found in three areas: the La Panza Range, the east slope of the Santa Lucia Mountains near Atascadero, and in the San Luis Range near Pismo Beach.

It grows in chaparral and closed-cone pine forest habitatss, on shale and sandstone outcrops and slopes.

Description
Arctostaphylos pilosula is an erect and bristly shrub growing  in height.

The leaves are a round, oval shape and dull and hairless in texture.

Its bloom period is December to March.

The fruit is a reddish-brown drupe about a centimeter wide, that ripen in the summer.

Conservation
The species is listed on the California Native Plant Society Inventory of Rare and Endangered Plants as a fairly endangered and vulnerable species.

References

External links
Calflora Database: Arctostaphylos pilosula (La Panza manzanita,  Santa Margarita manzanita)
Jepson Manual eFlora (TJM2) treatment of Arctostaphylos pilosula
USDA Plants Profile for Arctostaphylos pilosula (La Panza manzanita)
UC Photos gallery — Arctostaphylos pilosula

pilosula
Endemic flora of California
Natural history of the California chaparral and woodlands
Natural history of the California Coast Ranges
Natural history of San Luis Obispo County, California
Santa Lucia Range
Plants described in 1938